Sar Pir (also Romanized as Sar Pīr) is a village in Dowrahan Rural District, Gandoman District, Borujen County, Chaharmahal and Bakhtiari Province, Iran. At the 2006 census, its population was 139, with 28 families. The village is populated by Lurs.

References 

Populated places in Borujen County
Luri settlements in Chaharmahal and Bakhtiari Province